William Jones (died July 1640) was a British politician who sat in the House of Commons  in 1614. 

Jones was the son of John Jones of Treowen. In 1614, Jones was elected Member of Parliament for Monmouthshire. He was High Sheriff of Monmouthshire in 1615. 

He was responsible for rebuilding the family house at Treowen where he lived in 1628.

Jones married Jane Gwillim (or Gwilym), daughter of Moore Gwillim of Monmouth.

References

Year of birth missing
1640 deaths
English MPs 1614
High Sheriffs of Monmouthshire